Warren Kozak (born 1951) is an American journalist and author. His writing appears frequently on the OpEd pages of The Wall Street Journal, the New York Sun and other newspapers and magazines. He was an on-air reporter at National Public Radio and wrote for television network anchors including Ted Koppel, Charles Gibson, Diane Sawyer and Aaron Brown.

Personal life and education
Warren Kozak was born and raised in Milwaukee, Wisconsin, where he attended public schools, graduating from John Marshall High School.  He graduated from the University of Wisconsin-Madison in 1973 with a degree in Political Science.  He now lives in New York with his family.

Writing career
Kozak is the author of The Rabbi of 84th Street, a biography of Haskel Besser, which chronicles the Hasidic world of pre-World War II Poland, its destruction and its post-War rebirth. It was published by HarperCollins in 2004.

His second book, LeMay: The Life and Wars of General Curtis LeMay was released in 2009. In October 2010, he delivered the Exemplar keynote address at the United States Air Force Academy on the occasion of the selection of Curtis LeMay as the Exemplar of the Class of 2013. He has also lectured at West Point.

Publications

 The Rabbi of 84th Street: The Extraordinary Life of Haskel Besser, HarperCollins, 2004, 
 LeMay: The Life and Wars of General Curtis LeMay, Regnery, 2009,  
 Presidential Courage: Three Speeches That Changed America, 2012.

Prizes
Kozak was awarded the Benton Fellowship at the University of Chicago in 1993.

References

External links
 Official website
 Interview on LeMay at the Pritzker Military Museum & Library on June 4, 2009

1951 births
Living people
American male non-fiction writers
Writers from Milwaukee
University of Chicago alumni
 University of Wisconsin–Madison College of Letters and Science alumni
Writers from Chicago
20th-century American journalists
American male journalists